The R69S, R69US, and R69 are motorcycles, fitted with 594 cc boxer twin engines, that were manufactured by BMW in Munich, Germany.

Production history
From 1955 to 1969, 15,347 of these 594 cc shaft-drive, opposed twin motorcycles were built. The  R69 was produced from 1955 to 1960, the  R69S was produced from 1960 to 1969, and the 42 hp R69US was produced from 1968 to 1969.
These models were designed as relatively high powered, high compression sport bikes, although the  Earles fork R69 and R69S came with sidecar lugs installed on the frames. These lugs were deleted from the telescopic fork "US" models. The low compression  R60/2, produced from 1955 to 1960, was designed primarily for sidecar use, though it was popularly used as a solo bike, along with the 30 hp R60US, which was produced between 1968 and 1969.

The sport-oriented R69S, R69US, and R69 succeeded the plunger-framed 1951 to 1955 R68, which had an engine very similar to that in the later R69.

The R69US models, with telescopic forks, which were used later on the BMW R-/5 series motorcycles, were introduced in the United States for the 1968 model year and then continued for 1969. Front and rear side reflectors, demanded by the U. S. Department of Transportation, were introduced only for the 1969 model year, along with a DOT sticker that was placed on the rear fender. The previous Earles fork continued to be offered during these years.

In June 1962, Cycle World magazine published a review of the R69S. Its initial and concluding paragraphs read:

Specifications
R69S Specifications. (R69 specifications shown in parentheses when different from the R69S)

 Start of Production — 1960      (1955)
 End of Production — 1969      (1960)
 Numbers Produced — (11,317)      2,956

Engine
 Internal Designation — 268/3      (268/2)
 Motor Type — Four-stroke two cylinder flat twin
 Bore × Stroke — 72 mm × 73 mm (2.83 in × 2.87 in)
 Displacement — 594 cc
 Max Power —  at 7000 rpm      ( at 6800 rpm)
 Compression Ratio — 9.5:1       (7.5:1)
 Valves — OHV
 Carburation System — 2 carburetors, Type Bing 1/26/75-1/26/76 or 1/26/91-1/26/92      (1/26/9-1/26/10)
 Engine Lubricating System — Forced feed lubrication
 Oil Pump — Gear pump

Power Transmission
 Clutch — Single plate, saucer spring, dry
 Number of Gears — 4
 Shifting — Foot shifting
 Gearbox Ratios — 4.17/2.73/1.94/1.54      (5.33/3.02/2/04/1.54)
 Rear Wheel Ratio — 1:3.375 or 1:3.13; with sidecar 1:4.33      (1:3.18 or 1:4.25 sidecar)
 Bevel/Crownwheel — 8/25 or 8/27 teeth; with sidecar 6/26      (11/35; 8/34 sidecar)

Electrical System
 Ignition System — Magneto ignition
 Generator — Bosch LJ/CGE 60/6/1700 R      (Noris L 60/6/1500L)
 Spark Plugs — Bosch W260T1 or Beru 260/14      (Bosch W240T1)

Chassis
 Designation — 245/2      (245/1)
 Frame — Double loop steel tubular frame
 Front wheel suspension — Earles fork with suspension units and oil pressure shock absorbers
 Rear wheel suspension — Long swing arm with suspension units and oil pressure shock absorbers
 Wheel rims — Deep bed 2.15B × 18; with sidecar, rear 2.75C × 18
 Tires, Front — 3.5 × 18 S
 Tires, Rear — 3.50 S (4 × 18 S with sidecar)
 Brakes, Front — Drum brake  diameter duplex full hub
 Brakes, Rear — Drum brake  diameter simplex full hub

Dimensions/Weights
 Length × Width × Height — 2125 mm × 722 mm × 980 mm; (83.66 in × 28.42 in × 38.58 in)
 Wheel Base — 1415 mm (55.7 in); with original sidecar 1450 mm (57.1 in)
 Fuel Tank Capacity — 17 L (3.73 imp or 4.49 US gal)
 Unladen Weight with Full Tank — ; with original sidecar 
 Idle/Riding Noise — 84/82 DIN phon; from 13 September 1966: 78/84 dB(A)
 Load Rating — ; with original sidecar 
 Fuel Consumption — 5.3 liters/100 km / 44 mpg (US)      (3.6 L/100 km or 64 mpg (US))
 Oil Consumption — 0.5 - 1 liters/1,000 km approx.
 Top Speed —      

Speed record
In 1961 an English team of four riders used a considerably modified machine to set 12 and 24-hour average-speed records for both 750 cc and 1000 cc categories at Montlhéry, France. Modifications included a tuned engine with higher final drive ratio, a race-crouch riding position with race-style full fairing, and extra lights.

See also

BMW R51/3
BMW R60/2
History of BMW motorcycles
List of motorcycles of the 1950s

References

Notes

Bibliography

 “Birth of a Legend,” Cycle World magazine, June 1962
 “1965 R69S,” The Art of BMW: 85 Years of Motorcycling Excellence, by Peter Gantriis and Henry von Wartenburg, MBI Publishing Co., Minneapolis, 2008
 BMW Profiles: Motorcycles from Munich, 1923–1969, BMW Mobile Tradition, Munich, Germany, 1997

External links

1956 BMW R69 — Selling Performance, AMA Motorcycle Hall of Fame Museum
BMW's R69US: Born to Wander, Motorcycle Classics, May/June 2007
BMW R69S at Bonhams

R69S
Motorcycles powered by flat engines
Shaft drive motorcycles
Motorcycles introduced in 1955